Song Ikpil (February 10, 1534 - August 8, 1599) was a politician and Neo-Confucian scholar and educator. His pennames were Gubong (구봉, 龜峰) and Hyeonseung (현승, 玄繩), and his courtesy name was Unjang (운장, 雲長). Song was best friends of Yi I, Seong Hon and Jeong Cheol and taught Kim Jang-saeng.

Publications 
 Gubong jip (구봉집, 龜峰集)
 Hyeonseung jip (현승집, 玄繩集)
 Garye juseol (가례주설, 家禮註說)
 Hyeonseung pyeon (현승편, 玄繩編)

See also 
 Yi I
 Seong Hon
 Gim Jangsaeng
 An Bangjun
 Gim Jip

External links 
 Song Ikpil 
 Song Ikpil:Encyclopedia of Korean Culture 
 Song Ikpil 
 구봉 송익필선생 주벽.휴정서원 2009년 춘향제 봉행 굿모닝논산 
 정오대담-이홍근 문경공 구봉 송익필 선생 선양사업회장 대전일보 2010.04.20 
 [역동의당진역사 20장면]⑩구봉 송익필 대전일보 2011.09.21 
 [고미술 읽기]편지로 나눈 3인의 35년 우정 경향신문 2007.04.06

References

1534 births
1599 deaths
Korean politicians
Korean scholars
Korean male poets
Korean Confucianists
16th-century Korean philosophers
Neo-Confucian scholars
16th-century Korean poets
Yeosan Song clan